Lemonade for Vampires is the seventh and last album released by the band Gas Huffer on Estrus Records in 2005.

Track listing 
 Hold the Roll
 Monument
 Another Wafer, Please
 Kingdom Of The Sun
 Canadian Vistas
 Easter Grass
 All Natural
 Mayfield
 Taco And A Bottle
 Midnight At The Apollo 13
 Long White River
 Termite Thermometer
 Ruined
 Untitled

Gas Huffer albums
2005 albums
Albums produced by Johnny Sangster